Anthurium veitchii,  the king anthurium, is an epiphytic species of flowering plant in the genus Anthurium native to Colombia. It is grown in more temperate climates as a greenhouse or houseplant for its large, pendulous leaves that can be several feet long.

The Latin specific epithet veitchii refers to a longstanding group of plant nurseries based in Exeter, UK, originated by John Veitch.

References

External links

veitchii
Plants described in 1876